Amedeo Simonetti (8 April 1874, Genoa - 22 April 1922, Rome) was an Italian painter; known primarily for his Orientalist scenes. He was sometimes referred to by his childhood nickname, Momo.

Biography
He came to the career of artist late, and was first inspired by the example of his uncles, Ettore, an Orientalist painter, and Attilio, a former associate of the Spanish artist, Mariano Fortuny. 

He began by painting the countryside in the vicinity of Prati, a rapidly urbanizing area where the natural scenery was disappearing. Under the influence of his uncle and Costantini, he also produced Orientalist scenes and genre works depicting 18th century figures (courtiers, musketeers and church officials), in lavish settings. 

In 1919, by invitation of Onorato Carlandi, he joined an artists' society known as the "", devoted to the free pursuit of artistic expression, and much informal  socializing. Later, he brought his son,  into the organization.

He also had major showings at the Venice Biennale, in 1904 and 1908, and at the Milan International in 1906.

Sources
 Aurelio Tommaso Prete, I Simonetti: Amedeo, Accademia internazionale per l'unità della cultura, 1985 
 Cecilia Pericoli Ridolfini (ed.), Roma e la campagna romana nella pittura di Amedeo e Virgilio Simonetti, Fondazione Lemmermann, 1986
 Renato Mammucari, La campagna romana: immagini dal passato, Newton Compton, 1991
 Amedeo Simonetti, La Roma dei Simonetti: vedute della Capitale tra '800 e '900, Cromosema, 1999  
 Renato Mammucari, "Se non è l'inizio è la fine a dar voce al coro", in:  , 2006

External links

More works by Simonetti @ ArtNet

1874 births
1922 deaths
Painters from Genoa
Italian genre painters
Italian orientalists
Italian watercolourists